Forces Command (FORCOMD) is the largest command within the Australian Army responsible for the combat brigades, the enabling and training formations reporting to the Chief of the Army with approximately 85% of the Army's personnel. The Command was formed on 1 July 2009 with the amalgamation of Land Command and Training Command, and is led by a major general as the Commander Forces Command (COMD FORCOMD).

History
On 27 September 2008 the Chief of Army, Lieutenant General Ken Gillespie, announced a restructure of the army command structure named Adaptive Army. The structure had remained nearly the same since the Hassett Review restructure in 1973 of Land Command and Training Command.

Structure

 Headquarters, Forces Command (Victoria Barracks, New South Wales)
 1st Brigade
3rd Brigade
6th Combat Support Brigade
7th Brigade
9th Brigade
17th Sustainment Brigade
Royal Military College of Australia (Duntroon Garrison, ACT)
Army Logistics Training Centre (Bandiana, Vic)
Defence Command Support Training Centre
Combined Arms Training Centre (Puckapunyal, Vic)

Commander Forces Command
The following have held the position of Commander Forces Command or its preceding positions, with the ranks and honours as at the completion of their tenure:

References

Military units and formations established in 2009
Military units and formations of the Australian Army